Callimache or Kallimache was a port town of ancient Caria. The Stadiasmus Maris Magni mentions the town as being 50 stadia from Daedala.

Its site is located near modern Göcek in Asiatic Turkey.

References

Populated places in ancient Caria
Former populated places in Turkey